Kanajeji Dan Yaji, known as Kanajeji, was the 13th ruler of Kano and, for a period, the ruler of Zazzau. He reigned from 1390 - 1410. Like his father, Yaji I, Kanajeji was an intrepid king whose reign was characterized by war, conquest, and religious reformation. Kanajeji engaged in two long and pivotal wars with Umbatu and Zazzau, and eventually prevailed in both, after lengthy feuds. He took Umbatu in four attempts, and Zazzau after two battles. He also renewed the suzerainty his father had imposed over the Kwararafa. However, in a bid to conquer Zazzau, his reign also saw the return of the pagan practices his father sought to expunge. He is credited with revolutionizing Kano's army through the introduction of quilted leather armors (lifidi), steel armors, coats of mail, and iron helmets.

Lineage and Accession 
He was the son of the first Sultan of Kano, Ali Yaji Dan Tsamiya and Aunaka. The short reign of his father's successor, his uncle, Muhammad Bugaya, was pervaded with peace and tranquility because Yaji had finally solidified their family's grasp on Kano. His uncle sought repose and handed over official duties to the Galadima. Kanajeji succeeded Bugaya after his death in 1390.

Reign 
Like his father, Kanajeji he immediately set out to extend the reach of the Sultanate, engaging in multiple conquests all over the region. He requested that the Kwararafa paid tribute to him like they did his father so they sent him two hundred slaves. The Kwararafa continued to send him slaves while he continued to send them horses.

War with Umbatu 
Kanajeji's first attempt at subduing Umbatu resulted in an emphatic defeat. The casualties Kano suffered forced him to modernize his army by introducing armor, iron helmets, and coats of mail. He returned to Umbatu twice more in two successive years but failed both times. However, after failing a third time, he vowed  " I will not return to Kano, if Allah wills, until I conquer the enemy.". The fourth attempt, he utilized the same strategy that his father had used to conquer the Kwararafa. He started a siege which lasted for two years until the people of Umbatu were starved out and forced to concede defeat. They gave the Sultan a thousand male slaves and a thousand female slaves from among their children, and then gave him another two thousand slaves.

"No one shall again conquer Umbatu as I have conquered it, though he may gain spoil."

First Battle With Zazzau 
After Umbatu, Kanajeji then set his sights on the Hausa State of Zazzau. This was Kano's first recorded war with Zazzau. He camped at Turunku, where their armies clashed. The men of Zazzau defeated the men of Kano after which they taunted  "What is Kano? Kano is 'bush!'".

Reintroduction of pagan practices 
Sarkin Tchibiri: "Re-establish the god that your father and grandfather destroyed...Whatever you wish for in this world, do as our forefathers did of old"

Kanajeji: "True, but tell me what I am to do with it...Show me, and I will do even as they did."

Disappointed by his defeat in Zazzau, the Sultan of Kano sought advice as to how to defeat them. He was advised by the Sarkin Tchibiri to reintroduce the gods his father and grandfather had outlawed. He was then guided through a few pagan rituals by Sarkin Tchibiri while singing the "Song of Barbushe".

Return to Zazzau 
A year after the first battle, Kanajeji set out to Zazzau once again. This time he camped at Gadaz and the army of Zazzau came to meet him. The army of Kano slayed the King of Zazzau and most of their chiefs. The men of Zazzau fled for their lives. He entered Zazzau and reigned near Shika for eight months where he gained much spoil from the people of Zazzau.

"Son of Kano, hurler of the kere, Kanajeji, drinker of the water of Shika, preventer of washing in the Kubanni, Lord of the town, Lord of the land"

Death 
Kanajeji died in 1410. The three subsequent rulers of Kano were his sons, Umaru, Dauda, and Abdullahi Burja.

Biography in the Kano Chronicle
Below is a full biography of Kanajeji from Palmer's 1908 English translation of the Kano Chronicle.

References 

Monarchs of Kano
14th-century births
1410 deaths
Year of birth unknown